Anticlea is a genus of moths in the family Geometridae first described by James Francis Stephens in 1831.

Species
 Anticlea badiata (Denis & Schiffermüller, 1775) – shoulder stripe
 Anticlea cabrerai
 Anticlea correlata Warren, 1901
 Anticlea derivata (Denis & Schiffermüller, 1775) – streamer
 Anticlea multiferata (Walker, 1863) – many-lined carpet
 Anticlea pectinata (Rindge, 1967)
 Anticlea switzeraria (W. S. Wright, 1916)
 Anticlea vasiliata Guenée, 1857 – variable carpet

References

Larentiini
Geometridae genera